Young Man with a Horn may refer to:

 Young Man with a Horn (novel), a novel by Dorothy Baker, loosely based on the life of Bix Beiderbecke
 Young Man with a Horn (film), a film adaptation of the novel
 Young Man with a Horn (soundtrack), an album featuring Doris Day and Harry James performing songs from the film's soundtrack
 Young Man With A Horn (Miles Davis album), a 10" jazz album on Blue Note by the Miles Davis Sextet
 "Young Man with a Horn" (CSI episode), a ninth-season episode of CSI: Crime Scene Investigation